Gianni Pettenati (born in Piacenza, Italy on 29 October 1945) is an Italian singer and musical critic. He is most famous for his Italian cover versions of great international hits. He is also the author of plays and books on the history of Italian music.

Career
Gianni Pettenati started very early winning a music contest when he was 8 years old and acted in a play Pirandello. In April 1965 he won the Festival di Bellaria, then joined a group called the Juniors in 1966 to record "Come una pietra che rotola", a cover version of "Like a Rollin 'Stone originally by Bob Dylan. This was followed by "Il superuomo" again with the Juniors, this time a cover of "Sunshine Superman" by Donovan, with the B-side being "Puoi farmi piangere", a cover of "I Put a Spell on You" from Screamin' Jay Hawkins".

His greatest success came with "Bandiera Gialla" the Italian version of "The Pied Piper". In 1967, he participated in the Sanremo Music Festival with "La rivoluzione" and again in 1968 with "La tramontana".

Pettenati still continues to sing with mostly repertoire of his earlier hits in the 1960s. He was on stage in musical theater "Quei bravi ragazzi", with a history of Italian song told from memory. With Pettenati as story teller there are five artists accompanying him: Delia Rimoldi (actress and singer), Raffaele Koheler (trumpet player of the Banda Osiris and Ottavo Ricther), Maurizio Dosi (actor and accordion player) and Luca Maciachini (vocals and guitar).

Gianni Pettenati is also a musical critic, author of novels, plays and many books on the history of Italian music. His punblished works include: 
"Quelli eran giorni - 30 anni di canzoni italiane", co-authored with Red Ronnie (Edizioni Ricordi)
"Gli anni '60 in America" (Edizioni Virgilio)
"Mina come sono" (Edizioni Virgilio)
"Io Renato Zero" (Edizioni Virgilio)
"Alice se ne va" (Edizioni Asefi)

Discography

Albums
1968: Gianni Pettenati 1
1973: Par la mort dun sunadur
1984: Bandiera Azzurra

Singles
1966: "Come una pietra che rotola"/"Siamo alla fine" (Gianni Pettenati & The Juniors)
1966: "Bandiera gialla"/"Se mi vuoi così"
1967: "Il superuomo"/"Puoi farmi piangere" (Gianni Pettenati & The Juniors)
1967: "La rivoluzione"/"Ciao ragazza, ciao"
1967: "Io credo in te"/"Lo sbaglio di volere te"
1967: "Un cavallo nella testa"/"Vai vai"
1968: "La tramontana"/"Voglio tornare a casa mia"
1968: "Cara judy ciao (Judy in disguise)"/"Tango"
1969: "Les Byciclettes de Belsize"/"Lingering on"
1969: "Caldo caldo"/"... e mi svegliavo (col cuore in gola)"
1970: "In mezzo al traffico"/"La musica continua"(with the Tombstones)
1970: "Candida/É già tardi ormai" (with the Tombstones)
1983: "Bandiera gialla"/"Bandiera gialla (instrumental)
1984: "Bandiera azzurra"/"Cade la neve"
1986: "Come sarà domani"/"Ho perso te"
1989: "Tutto è successo all'improvviso"/"Una canzone per non morire"
Released outside Italy
1968: "La tramontana"/"La balada de Bonnie and Clyde" (released in Spain)
1968: "La tramontana"/"Quiero volver a casa" (released in Argentina)
1968: "La tramontana"/"Voglio tornare a casa mia" (released in Brazil)
1969: "In mezzo al traffico"/"La musica continua" (released in Spain)

CDs
1995: Che cosa fanno gli angeli

Filmography
1967: I ragazzi di Bandiera Gialla

References

External links
Gianni Pettenati fan website

Italian male singers
Italian music critics
Italian male non-fiction writers
1945 births
Living people
People from Piacenza